William Henry Allan Munro (1856 – 23 February 1913) was an architect in Queensland, Australia. Some of his works are now heritage-listed.

Early life 
Munro was born in Inverness, Scotland, in 1856, the son of tailor George Munro and his wife Mary ( Allan). He trained under Matthews & Lawrie.

Architectural career 
In 1886, he emigrated to Queensland and worked as an architect for Rooney Brothers of Townsville. There, he won the competition for the Queensland Hotel and was taken into partnership by Walter Eyre in 1887. After the firm ceased trading in 1892, Munro worked for the government but also undertook private contracts.

Death 
Munro died on 23 February 1913 in Brisbane. The following day, he was interred at the South Brisbane Cemetery.

Significant works 
 1889: Bank of New South Wales Building, Charters Towers
 1889: Holy Trinity Anglican Church, Herberton
 1890: Ferrari Estates Building, Cooktown
 1891: Townsville School of Arts
 1910: The Grand Hotel, Hughenden

References 

1856 births
1913 deaths
19th-century Australian architects
20th-century Australian architects
People from Inverness
Scottish emigrants to colonial Australia